Bottle Lake is a suburb in the north-east of Christchurch with a low number of residents. Most of the suburb is covered by Bottle Lake Forest, which has since the mid-1970s become a popular recreation area.

The area was known as Waitikiri to Māori and the swamplands around a lake was a traditional mahinga kai (food gathering place). Bottle Lake was first granted for grazing in 1853. The area was bought as a sheep run by John McLean in 1860. He sold the land after only two years to Edward Reece, who named his homestead Waitikiri after the Māori name for the area. Reece commissioned John Gibb to paint Bottle Lake about 20 years after he purchased the land. Reece died in 1885, and the painting was gifted to the Canterbury Society of Arts in 1902 by his son, William Reece. The oil painting is today owned by the Christchurch Art Gallery.

Most of the area was purchased in 1878 by Christchurch City Council for waste disposal, but grazing continued into the next century. The pine plantation was begun in 1912, and the land was drained. By the late 1930s, the lake had dried up. The name of the lake was used for other purposes. The hospital board looked for a remote area where an infectious diseases hospital could be set up, and they established the Bottle Lake Hospital. This has since been renamed Burwood Hospital. The road leading to the hospital was originally called Bottle Lake Road and has since been changed to Burwood Road. The suburb that formed around the hospital took its later name—Burwood.

The production forest was out of bounds, and the area was virtually unknown to Christchurch people. This changed in 1975, when the forest was given park status. It has since developed into a recreation area, with mountain biking, horse riding, and walking all very popular. There is some housing on the fringes of Bottle Lake Forest, and Waitikiri Drive is a reminder of the area's original name.

The former landfill site within Bottle Lake was reopened after the February 2011 Christchurch earthquake to take an estimated 4.5 million tonnes of demolition material.

Demographics

Styx had a population of 1,092 at the 2018 New Zealand census, a decrease of 42 people (-3.7%) since the 2013 census, and an increase of 153 people (16.3%) since the 2006 census. There were 480 households. There were 579 males and 513 females, giving a sex ratio of 1.13 males per female. The median age was 44.3 years (compared with 37.4 years nationally), with 177 people (16.2%) aged under 15 years, 180 (16.5%) aged 15 to 29, 588 (53.8%) aged 30 to 64, and 147 (13.5%) aged 65 or older.

Ethnicities were 91.5% European/Pākehā, 11.3% Māori, 1.9% Pacific peoples, 1.6% Asian, and 3.3% other ethnicities (totals add to more than 100% since people could identify with multiple ethnicities).

The proportion of people born overseas was 12.1%, compared with 27.1% nationally.

Although some people objected to giving their religion, 58.8% had no religion, 29.7% were Christian, 0.5% were Muslim, 0.5% were Buddhist and 3.0% had other religions.

Of those at least 15 years old, 102 (11.1%) people had a bachelor or higher degree, and 243 (26.6%) people had no formal qualifications. The median income was $33,900, compared with $31,800 nationally. The employment status of those at least 15 was that 483 (52.8%) people were employed full-time, 159 (17.4%) were part-time, and 27 (3.0%) were unemployed.

References

Suburbs of Christchurch